Lanna International School Thailand is a British international school in Chiang Mai, Thailand.

Lanna was founded in 1993 to serves the Chiang Mai community by providing a high quality British curriculum based education in a non-sectarian, English-medium, international school setting. Lanna is licensed by the Thai Ministry of Education and has been fully accredited by the Western Association of Schools and Colleges (WASC) since 2002.

Year on year Lanna School increase their fees by at least 30 percent. Since 2019 the school fee has actually doubled. 

Lanna is a member of the East Asia Regional Council of Overseas Schools (EARCOS). In 2005 Lanna also gained the status of becoming a Cambridge University International Examination Centre. Lanna offers its students the opportunity to gain an American High School Certificate, but also British qualifications in the form of Cambridge IGCSEs and Cambridge International AS and A levels.

Today, Lanna's 610+ students in Pre-Nursery through Year 13 represent over twenty nationalities and more than seventeen languages making it truly international, with students of diverse cultural and linguistic backgrounds.

References

External links
 Lanna International School Thailand Official website

International schools in Chiang Mai
Educational institutions established in 1993
1993 establishments in Thailand
Private schools in Thailand